Furor (P-46) is an offshore patrol vessel and the sixth of the Meteoro class created for the Spanish Navy.

Order and construction 
On 7 May 2014, SEPI announced that it had approved the construction of two new units, one to be built at the Cadiz shipyard in San Fernando / Puerto Real and the other at Ferrol. The first sheet metal cut for these vessels, was carried out simultaneously in the shipyards of the bay of Cadiz and those of the Ferrol estuary on 5 December 2014. Order No. DEF/1564/2015 was published in the Official State Gazette on 26 June 2015, which names of these two ships as Audaz and Furor.

On 29 April 2016, the first of the ship's blocks was placed on a grade. Its delivery to the Spanish Navy is scheduled for 2018. The launching of the ship has been delayed several times due to labor conflicts with the employees of Navantia. The launch planned for July 2017 and, after three attempts, was postponed in early September and, due to new conflicts, the launch was delayed a few weeks, scheduled for mid or late that month. Finally, the sixth ship of the class, called Furor, was launched on 8 September 2017, in a private act (something atypical, as they are usually launched in a public act) and without being finished the structure, since the superstructure is not yet assembled. The ship was commissioned on 21 January 2019.

On 6 May 2020,  tried to ward off Furor, which was making an illegal incursion into what Gibraltar consider its territorial waters, playing the Spanish National Anthem on Radio Channel Ch16.

References 

Ships of the Spanish Navy
Buque de Acción Marítima
Ships built in Spain
2017 ships